Love Is in the Air is a European only compilation album by Australian pop singer John Paul Young. The album was released in January 1978 to capitalise on the success of the song "Love Is in the Air", which was released in December 1977 and charted within the top 10 in Netherlands by January 1978. The album include songs from Young's three studio albums Hero, J.P.Y. and Green.

Track listing 
Side A
 "Love Is in the Air" (Harry Vanda, George Young) – 3:27
 "Take the Money" – 3:40
 "I Wanna Do It with You" (H. Vanda, G. Young) – 2:57
 "Gay Time Rock 'N' Roll City"  (Warren Morgan, John Paul Young) – 3:44
 "Here We Go" (Morgan) – 3:38

Side B
 "The Same Old Thing" (Morgan, J.P. Young) – 3:20
 "Just Can't Do It" (Morgan, J.P. Young) – 2:55
 "Bad Trip"  (H. Vanda, G. Young) – 3:10
 "Where the Action Is" (H. Vanda, G. Young) – 3:05
 "The Painting"  (H. Vanda, G. Young) – 4:25

Charts

References 

1978 greatest hits albums
John Paul Young albums
Ariola Records compilation albums
Compilation albums by Australian artists